The 2019 Clemson Tigers football team represented Clemson University during the 2019 NCAA Division I FBS football season. The Tigers were led by head coach Dabo Swinney, in his 11th full year. The Tigers competed as members of the Atlantic Coast Conference (ACC), and played their home games at Memorial Stadium in Clemson, South Carolina.

Entering the season as defending national champions, Clemson began the year ranked first in the polls. Despite securing another undefeated regular season and its fifth consecutive conference title after defeating Virginia in the ACC Championship Game, Clemson fell to third in the final College Football Playoff rankings of the season, owing to its comparatively weak strength of schedule. They were selected to the Fiesta Bowl to play second-seeded Ohio State, where the Tigers won by a score of 29–23. Clemson advanced to the National Championship Game, where they lost to LSU, 42–25, ending their winning streak at 29 games and finishing the season at 14–1.

Clemson was led by sophomore quarterback Trevor Lawrence, who led the ACC with 3,665 passing yards and 45 total touchdowns. Running back Travis Etienne was named ACC Player of the Year for the second consecutive year, leading the conference with 19 rushing touchdowns and 7.8 yards per carry, and finishing in second with 1,614 rushing yards. Offensive lineman John Simpson was named a consensus All-American, and he was joined on the first-team All-ACC by Lawrence, Etienne, wide receiver Tee Higgins, and offensive lineman Tremayne Anchrum. On defense, the team was led by All-American and ACC Defensive Player of the Year linebacker Isaiah Simmons. He was joined on the first-team All-ACC by cornerback A. J. Terrell and safety Tanner Muse.

Previous season
The Tigers entered the 2019 season as defending national champions, having finished the 2018 season 15–0, and 8–0 in ACC play. They won the ACC for the fourth consecutive season by beating Pittsburgh in the ACC Championship game, 42–10. The Tigers won the national championship 44–16 over Alabama in the CFP National Championship game. They were the first major college football program to finish with a record of 15–0 since Penn in 1897.

Offseason

Recruiting
Clemson's 2019 recruiting class consisted of 29 signees, including 17 that enrolled early and one that grayshirted. The class was ranked as the best class in the ACC and the 10th best class overall according to the 247Sports Composite.

Offseason departures

NFL draftees

Undrafted Free Agents

Transfers

Preseason

Award watch lists
Listed in the order that they were released

ACC Media Days
The ACC media poll was released on July 22, 2019. Clemson was the consensus pick to repeat once again as ACC Champion, receiving 171 votes to win the Atlantic Division and 170 votes to win the Conference Championship.

Schedule
Clemson announced its 2019 football schedule on January 16, 2019. The 2019 schedule consisted of seven home games and five away games in the regular season. The Tigers hosted ACC foes Georgia Tech, Florida State, Boston College, and Wake Forest and will travel to Syracuse, North Carolina, Louisville and NC State.

The Tigers hosted three of their four non-conference opponents, those being Texas A&M from the SEC, Charlotte from Conference USA and Wofford from the FCS' Southern Conference, and traveled to South Carolina from the SEC.

Personnel

Coaching staff

Roster

Source:

Depth chart

Rankings

Game summaries

Georgia Tech

Texas A&M

at Syracuse

Charlotte

at North Carolina

Florida State

at Louisville

Boston College

Wofford

at NC State

Wake Forest

at South Carolina

ACC Championship Game

vs. Ohio State (Fiesta Bowl – CFP Semifinal Game)

vs. LSU (CFP National Championship)

Awards and honors

Postseason

2020 NFL Draft

The 2020 NFL Draft will be held on April 23–25, 2020 in Paradise, Nevada.

Tigers who were picked in the 2020 NFL Draft:

Undrafted free agents

References

Clemson
Clemson Tigers football seasons
Atlantic Coast Conference football champion seasons
Fiesta Bowl champion seasons
Clemson Tigers football